"Alone on Christmas Day" is a song written by Mike Love and Ron Altbach for American rock band the Beach Boys. Intended for a potential Christmas album, their 1977 recording was left unreleased. In November 2015, Mike Love rerecorded the song as "(You'll Never Be) Alone on Christmas Day" and released it as a single. The next month, a version by French rock band Phoenix featuring Bill Murray was released.

Background

The song was written by the Beach Boys' co-founder Mike Love in collaboration with classical pianist Ron Altbach for a potential Christmas album. In 1977, a rough mix of the song was recorded by the group and later circulated via bootlegs. In early 2015, Phoenix requested permission to cover the song for Bill Murray's A Very Murray Christmas. In response, Love rerecorded the song himself and revised some of the lyrics. The version by Phoenix was then released. Besides Murray, their recording features Jason Schwartzman, Paul Shaffer, and New York Dolls' David Johansen (as Buster Poindexter). Phoenix's version was recorded in September and issued as a digital download and 7" vinyl.

References

2015 singles
Phoenix (band) songs
Unreleased songs
The Beach Boys bootleg recordings
Songs written by Mike Love
American Christmas songs
The Beach Boys songs
1977 songs
Songs about loneliness